Parche may refer to:

 Butterflyfish, some of which are called "parche"
 USS Parche, two submarines in the U.S. Navy 
Parche, Nepal